Min bäste vän (My Best Friend) is the seventh studio album by Swedish singer-songwriter Marie Fredriksson, released on 14 June 2006 by Capitol Records in conjunction with Fredriksson's own independent record label Mary Jane/Amelia Music. It is her sixth studio album of Swedish material, following her first and only English album The Change (2004).

Composition and style
The album is made up of cover versions of songs which Fredriksson first heard in the 1960s and 1970s, and consists predominantly of songs written by Swedish singer-songwriters John Holm  and Pugh Rogefeldt , as well as songs by Mikael Wiehe of the Hoola Bandoola Band . Fredriksson said she chose these tracks as they left an impression on her during adolescence, and helped to develop and shape her as a singer and songwriter in later life.

Release and promotion
"Sommaräng" was released as the album's lead single on 17 May 2006, backed by an exclusive b-side, a cover of Rogefeldt's "Små lätta moln" . The song was a hit in Sweden, peaking within the top ten of the airplay-based Svensktoppen chart, and at number 21 on the Swedish Singles Chart. The album was also successful, peaking at number three on the albums chart in Sweden. "Ingen kommer undan politiken" – a cover of Kate & Anna McGarrigle's "Complainte pour Ste. Catherine" with Swedish lyrics written by Ola Magnell – was released as an airplay-only promotional single in Sweden from 25 July.

Critical reception

The album received generally positive reviews upon release. Aftonbladet called it "a rather unassuming comeback", and said that Fredriksson "still has one of the country's strongest, most distinctive voices, which becomes even better when she's singing material which genuinely means something to her." They described "Den öde stranden" as the best song on the record. A writer for Expressen argued that the acoustic tracks on the album were superior to the more produced ones, explaining: "When there is enough space for all of her emotions to spit out, Marie comes across like a country goddess, and a master of Swedish blues." Norwegian newspaper Verdens Gang called it a "cracking disc", but complained that most songs would be unfamiliar to fans in Norway, and described the album as "surely a must-have for the most faithful Roxette fans, although for most others, it will be easy to forget."

Helsingborgs Dagblad praised Fredriksson for compiling a "courageous" record, saying: "Putting together an album of rock classics from '70s favourites such as Pugh Rogerfeldt, John Holm, Cornelis Vreeswijk, Hoola Bandoola Band, Tom Paxton and Tim Hardin is probably a thought that scares the shit out of the majority of established artists with any sense of self-esteem. But such embarrassment does not exist [for Min bäste vän]. From the first track, she makes it clear that this is not an attempt to murder these songs, but to introduce them to others for them to love for years to come." They also complimented the quality of Fredriksson's vocals and the amount of improvisation found on the album, particularly Ola Gustafsson's guitar work on "Sommaräng" and Mats Ronander's harmonica playing on "Guldgruva".

Track listing

Credits and personnel
Credits adapted from the liner notes of Min bäste vän.

 All tracks recorded at Studio Vinden in Djursholm and Cosmos Studios in Stockholm; saxophones on track 9 recorded at St:Eriksplan 1 in Stockholm.
 All songs produced and arranged by Mikael Bolyos.
 Mastered by Björn Engelmann and Thomas Eberger at Cutting Room Studios in Stockholm.

Musicians
 Marie Fredriksson – lead and background vocals, keyboards 
 Micke Bolyos – background vocals , piano , keyboards, programming, engineering and mixing
 Staffan Astner – guitars 
 Ola Gustavsson – guitars , bass guitar , slide guitar 
 Per Lindvall – drums  and percussion 
 Sven Lindvall – bass guitar 
 Jokke Pettersson – guitars 
 Vincent Pontare – background vocals 

Additional musicians and technical personnel

 Maja Alderin-Landgren – background vocals 
 Kjell Andersson – sleeve design
 Edmund Benjamin – banjo 
 Tore Berglund – tenor and baritone saxophones 
 Petra Cabbe – make-up
 Mattias Edwall – photography
 Karin Hammar – trombone 
 Bengan Janson – accordion 
 Christer Jansson – drums 
 Roger Krieg – engineering and mixing
 Kalle Moraeus – violin 
 Mats Ronander – harmonica 
 Pär Wickholm – sleeve design

Charts

Release history

References

External links

Marie Fredriksson albums
2006 albums
Capitol Records albums
Pop rock albums by Swedish artists